Maraty is a rural locality (a settlement) and the administrative center of Maratovskoye Rural Settlement, Kochyovsky District, Perm Krai, Russia. The population was 504 as of 2010. There are 15 streets.

Geography 
Maraty is located 50 km east of Kochyovo (the district's administrative centre) by road. Buzhdym is the nearest rural locality.

References 

Rural localities in Kochyovsky District